The 2009 British 125 Championship season was the 22nd British 125cc Championship season. The championship went down to the very last meetings at Oulton Park, James Lodge leading by 18 points from Martin Glossop with Rob Guiver 23 points behind; after Glossop fell, Lodge only had to finish 14th to take the title. Lodge took a 7th-place finish to secure the title while Guiver moved above Glossop into second place in the championship.

Calendar

Championship standings

Riders' standings

References

External links
 The official website of the British Superbike Championship

125